Arthur James "Moose" Doll (May 7, 1913 – April 28, 1978) was a Major League Baseball player. He played three seasons with the Boston Braves and Bees from 1935 to 1936 and 1938.

Doll made his MLB debut in 1935 as a catcher, but had switched to a pitcher in the next season. His only decision came on September 25, 1936, as the Bees lost to the New York Giants, 3–2, at Braves Field.

Doll served in the US Army during World War II.

References

External links

Boston Bees players
Boston Braves players
1913 births
1978 deaths
Major League Baseball pitchers
Major League Baseball catchers
Columbia Senators players
Scranton Miners players
Hartford Laurels players
Hartford Bees players
Indianapolis Indians players
Williamsport Grays players
Springfield Rifles players
Albany Senators players
Tallahassee Pirates players
Salisbury Pirates players
Fargo-Moorhead Twins players
Baseball players from Chicago
United States Army personnel of World War II